Manuel Ignacio López Urzúa (born 18 June 1972) is a Chilean former professional footballer who played as a defender for clubs in Chile and Mexico.

Club career
A product of the O'Higgins youth system, he made an appearance for the club in the 1994 season, after playing on loan at Unión Santa Cruz in 1993.

In Chile he also played for Deportes Puerto Montt, being a well remembered player for the club, Huachipato, Cobresal, Deportes Arica, Rangers and Deportes Copiapó.

As an anecdote, as a member of Deportes Puerto Montt, in July 1999 he took part in a friendly international tournament in Singapore in the context of an economic and cultural exchange between Chile and the Asian country, where they faced Home United FC and Toluca. López was one of the most striking players due to his height.

Abroad he played in Mexico for both Toluca (loan) and León. With Toluca, he won the Primera División de México Verano 1998.

Personal life
He was nicknamed Robocop due to his strong build.

Honours
Toluca
 Primera División de México: 1998 Verano

References

External links
 
 Manuel López at Oocities.org 
 Manuel López at playmakerstats.com (English version of ceroacero.es)

1972 births
Living people
Chilean footballers
Chilean expatriate footballers
O'Higgins F.C. footballers
Deportes Santa Cruz footballers
Puerto Montt footballers
Deportivo Toluca F.C. players
Club León footballers
C.D. Huachipato footballers
Cobresal footballers
San Marcos de Arica footballers
Deportes Copiapó footballers
Primera B de Chile players
Chilean Primera División players
Liga MX players
Chilean expatriate sportspeople in Mexico
Expatriate footballers in Mexico
Association football defenders
Place of birth missing (living people)